Kiddush HaShem ( "sanctification of the Name") is a precept of Judaism. In Rabbinic sources and modern parlance, it refers to private and communal conduct which reflect well, instead of poorly, on the Jewish people.

Origins
The phrase "sanctification of the Name" does not occur in the Hebrew Bible, but the instruction "to sanctify [God]" and the converse command "you shall not profane My holy name" is frequently expressed. Any action by a Jew that brings honor, respect, and glory to God is considered to be sanctification of his name. In contrast, any behavior or action that disgraces, harms or shames God's name and his Torah is regarded as a chillul Hashem (desecration of the Name). The term appears throughout early Rabbinic literature, including the Sifre Devarim, the Talmud Yerushalmi, and the Talmud Bavli, and its principle -- acting in such a manner as to avoid the criticism of gentiles -- is cited for halakhic rulings.

Kedoshim

Martyrdom during the Hadrianic persecution is called sanctification of the Name in Bavli Berachot 20a and Midrash Tehillim. The ultimate act of sanctification of the Name is a Jew who is prepared to sacrifice his life rather than transgress any of God’s three cardinal laws: banning serving idols (Avodah Zarah, or foreign worship), committing certain sexual acts (such as incest or adultery) or committing murder. The commandment was introduced by the Exegetes.

See also
 Self-sacrifice in Jewish law

References

External links
 

Hebrew words and phrases in the Hebrew Bible
Jewish ethical law
 
Positive Mitzvoth
Hebrew words and phrases in Jewish law